Pershin is a Russian masculine surname, its feminine counterpart is Pershina. It may refer to:

Artyom Pershin (born 1988), Russian football player 
Irina Pershina (born 1978), Russian synchronized swimmer
Ivan Pershin (born 1980), Russian judoka 
Mikhail Pershin (born 1989), Kazakhstani futsal player
Veronica Pershina (born 1966), Soviet pair skater
Yelena Pershina (born 1963), Soviet long jumper
Yuri Pershin (footballer, born 1986), Russian football player
Yuri Pershin (footballer, born 1999), Russian football player

Russian-language surnames